Subrata (Hindi/ Sanskrit: सुव्रत, Odia: ସୁବ୍ରତ Bengali: সুব্রত), also Subroto (Read and written as by Bengalis and Javanese)  or Subrata/Subrat/Shubrat/Subroto/Suvrat (Read and Written as by Odias), is a common name in India, especially among Oriya and Bengali people and in Indonesia especially among Javanese and Sundanese people. The name is also somewhat common in Indonesia because many people there have Sanskrit derived names there as well (in Java, Subroto is more common due to Javanese spelling structure of changing 'a' into an 'o'. It means "devoted to what is right"). Subroto (Suvrat) is the name of the 20th Jain teerthankara Munisuvrata Nath who was born in Nalanda district. Subrata is also one among the thousands names of the god Vishnu listed in the Vishnu Sahasranama.
People bearing the name include :
Subrata of Magadha, King c. 1210 – 1150 BC
Subrata Roy, Chairman and Managing Worker, Sahara India Group, India
Subrata Roy, Inventor, Educator, Scientist - Professor at the University of Florida
Subroto Bagchi, Chairman of Mindtree
Subrata Bose, Bengali politician
Subrata Chowdhury, Tripuran Cricketer
Gatot Subroto, Former Indonesian military general
Subroto Ghosh, Indian cricketer
Subroto Guha, Indian cricketer
H. Subrata, Indonesian media magnate
Subrata Mitra, Indian cinematographer
Subrata Mukherjee, Indian politician
Subroto Mukerjee, the first Chief of staff of Indian Air Force
Raden Subroto (politician), Former Secretary General of OPEC and Indonesian administrator
Subrata Pal, Indian international footballer
Subrata Sen, Film director
Subrata (actor), Film Actor

Indian masculine given names